Mar-Mac is a census-designated place (CDP) in Wayne County, North Carolina, United States. The population was 3,011 at the 2007 census. It is included in the Goldsboro, North Carolina Metropolitan Statistical Area.

Geography
Mar-Mac is located at  (35.331502, -78.046751).

Demographics

As of the census of 2000, there were 3,004 people, 1,232 households, and 868 families residing in the CDP. The population density was 685.7 people per square mile (264.8/km). There were 1,485 housing units at an average density of 338.9 per square mile (130.9/km). The racial makeup of the CDP was 75.00% White, 19.54% African American, 0.53% Native American, 1.50% Asian, 2.10% from other races, and 1.33% from two or more races. Hispanic or Latino of any race were 3.16% of the population.

There were 1,232 households, out of which 30.3% had children under the age of 18 living with them, 54.1% were married couples living together, 13.4% had a female householder with no husband present, and 29.5% were non-families. 24.0% of all households were made up of individuals, and 8.2% had someone living alone who was 65 years of age or older. The average household size was 2.43 and the average family size was 2.88.

In the CDP, the population was spread out, with 22.5% under the age of 18, 9.5% from 18 to 24, 28.9% from 25 to 44, 26.8% from 45 to 64, and 12.4% who were 65 years of age or older. The median age was 38 years. For every 100 females, there were 97.0 males. For every 100 females age 18 and over, there were 93.1 males.

The median income for a household in the CDP was $40,145, and the median income for a family was $43,235. Males had a median income of $30,279 versus $21,715 for females. The per capita income for the CDP was $18,794. About 5.3% of families and 7.2% of the population were below the poverty line, including 13.9% of those under age 18 and none of those age 65 or over.

Education
Education in Mar-Mac is administered by the Wayne County Public School system with children attending schools in nearby townships. Higher education is offered through Wayne Community College in Goldsboro and Mount Olive College in Mount Olive.

Transportation

Passenger
Air: Mar-Mac is served through nearby Kinston Regional Jetport  with service to Orlando, Florida. Raleigh-Durham International Airport is the closest major airport with service to more than 45 domestic and international destinations. Goldsboro-Wayne Municipal Airport is an airport located nearby, but is only used for general aviation.
Interstate Highway: I-795 is the closest Interstate to Mar-Mac, which is located 5 miles north in Goldsboro.
Mar-Mac is not served directly by passenger trains. The closest Amtrak station is located in Selma.
Bus: The area is served by Greyhound with a location in nearby Goldsboro.

Roads
The main highways in Mar-Mac are US 117 and US 13.

References

Census-designated places in North Carolina
Census-designated places in Wayne County, North Carolina
Populated places on the Neuse River